Kang Yun-Mi (Hangul: 강윤미, Hanja: 姜允美, born February 10, 1988) is a South Korean short track speed skater who won gold in the 3000m relay at the 2006 Winter Olympics.

References

 

1988 births
Living people
South Korean female speed skaters
South Korean female short track speed skaters
Short track speed skaters at the 2006 Winter Olympics
Olympic short track speed skaters of South Korea
Olympic gold medalists for South Korea
Olympic medalists in short track speed skating
Medalists at the 2006 Winter Olympics
Medalists at the 2007 Winter Universiade
Universiade medalists in short track speed skating
World Short Track Speed Skating Championships medalists
Universiade gold medalists for South Korea
Competitors at the 2007 Winter Universiade
21st-century South Korean women